Amaurobius vachoni is a species of spider in the family Amaurobiidae, found in Spain.

References

vachoni
Spiders of Europe
Spiders described in 1965